The Costa Rica national under-20 football team represents Costa Rica in international football at this age level and is controlled by the Costa Rican Football Federation.

Competitive record

FIFA U-20 World Cup

* Denotes draws include knockout matches decided on penalty kicks.

Fixtures and recent results

The following is a list of match results from the previous 12 months, as well as any future matches that have been scheduled.

2022

Current squad
 The following players were called up for the 2022 CONCACAF U-20 Championship.
 Match dates: 18 June – 3 July 2022
 Caps and goals correct as of: 19 June 2022, after the match against 
 Names in italics denote players who have been capped for the senior team.

Honours
Major competitions
 CONCACAF Under-20 Championship
 Winners (2): 1988, 2009
 Runners-up (2): 1994, 2011

Individual awards
In addition to team victories, Costa Rican players have won individual awards at FIFA World Youth Cups.

Results

Record versus other nations at U-20 World Cup

See also
 Costa Rica national football team
 Costa Rica national under-23 football team
 Costa Rica national under-17 football team
 Costa Rica at the FIFA World Cup

References

Costa Rica national football team
Central American national under-20 association football teams